| tries = {{#expr:

 + 4 + 0 +  8 +  0 + 1 + 4 +  4 + 16 + 9 + 10
 + 4 + 6 +  6 +  3 + 3 + 4 +  3 +  7 + 3 +  9
 + 5 + 2 +  8 + 10 + 1 + 7 + 10 +  8 + 9 +  3
 + 7 + 9 +  4 + 11 + 2 + 4 + 15 +  4 + 7 +  5
 + 3 + 7 + 11 +  5 + 1 + 3 +  6 +  4 + 4 + 13
 + 4 + 1 +  9 +  2 + 3 + 5 +  6 + 13 + 9 +  7
 + 6 + 2 + 7 + 6
 + 3 + 5
 + 3
}}
| top point scorer = Jérôme Porical (Stade Français)(83 points)
| top try scorer = William Helu (London Wasps)(7 tries)
| venue = Cardiff Arms Park
| attendance2 = 12,483
| champions =  Northampton Saints
| count = 2
| runner-up =  Bath
| website = https://web.archive.org/web/20080506141030/http://www.ercrugby.com/eng/
| previous year = 2012–13
| previous tournament = 2012–13 European Challenge Cup
| next year = 2014–15
| next tournament = 2014–15 European Rugby Challenge Cup
}}
The 2013–14 Amlin Challenge Cup was the 18th and final season of the European Challenge Cup, Europe's second tier club rugby union competition. A total of 23 teams participated: 20 in the pool stage, plus three teams parachuting into the knockout stages from the Heineken Cup. The original 20 teams represented six countries.

The pool stage began on 10 October 2013 and ran until 19 January 2014, followed by the knockout stages. The final was originally to be held in France in May 2014, however the Federation Française de Rugby subsequently announced that they had withdrawn their application to host due to uncertainty over the availability of Stade de France. ERC invited the Heineken Cup participating countries to submit tenders for the right to host the Heineken Cup and Challenge Cup finals and three – England, Scotland and Wales – submitted bids. Cardiff was selected with the Heineken Cup final to be held in the Millennium Stadium on Saturday, 24 May 2014 and the Challenge Cup final to be held the previous day in the Cardiff Arms Park.

The defending Challenge Cup champions, Ireland's Leinster, did not defend their crown because they earned an automatic berth in the Heineken Cup, and qualified for the knockout stages of the Heineken Cup. In an all-English final, Northampton Saints defeated Bath 30–16 at the Cardiff Arms Park, to win the tournament for the second time.	
	
On 10 April 2014, following nearly two years of negotiations, an agreement for a new European club competition structure was reached. ERC would be wound up and replaced by a new Switzerland-based organising body known as European Professional Club Rugby. The European Challenge Cup underwent a minor name change to become the European Rugby Challenge Cup, remaining as a 20-team competition, though two of these teams will come from a new competition, featuring teams from nations who do not compete in the Six Nations. The Heineken Cup would be replaced by a new top-tier competition, the European Rugby Champions Cup, which would continue to involve clubs from all of the top six European nations, but featuring 20 clubs instead of the 24 in the Heineken Cup. The new third-tier competition, to be known as the qualifying competition, would feature clubs from second-tier European rugby nations, plus Italian clubs that do not play in the Pro12.

Teams
The qualifying teams were
 England: 6 teams from the Aviva Premiership that did not qualify for the Heineken Cup
 France: 7 teams from the Top 14 that did not qualify for the Heineken Cup
 Wales: 1 team from the Pro12 that did not qualify for the Heineken Cup
 Italy: the 4 teams that finished in the top four places in the National Championship of Excellence
 Portugal: one team formed to play in the Challenge Cup. ERC awarded the spot to Portugal after Olympus Rugby XV withdrew from the competition
 Romania: one team that is formed every season to play in the Challenge Cup, consisting of rugby players playing in the domestic Romanian leagues

Seeding
Teams that did not qualify for the 2013–14 Heineken Cup were ordered into four tiers according to the European Rugby Club Ranking.  Five pools of four teams were drawn comprising one team from each tier.

The brackets show each team's European Rugby Club Ranking at the end of the 2013–14 season.

Pool stage

The draw for the pool stage took place on 5 June 2013 at the Aviva Stadium in Dublin.  The dates and times of the first 4 rounds were announced on 27 July 2013.  Lusitanos XV replaced Olympus Madrid on 2 September 2013.

Points breakdown:
4 points for a win
2 points for a draw
1 bonus point for scoring four or more tries in a match (TB)
1 bonus point for a loss by seven points or less (LB)
Source: www.ercrugby.com

Pool 1

Pool 2

Pool 3

Pool 4

Pool 5

Seeding for knockout stage
Following the end of the pool stage, the five pool winners will be seeded alongside the three 2013–14 Heineken Cup pool runners-up who failed to qualify for the Heineken Cup quarter-finals – designated (HC).  Teams are ranked by total number of competition points earned (4 for a win, 2 for a draw, etc.) in the pool stage. If this does not separate the teams, qualification/ranking is based on:
(a) the number of tries scored in all pool matches;
(b) aggregate points difference from all pool matches;
(c) the club with the fewest players sent off and/or suspended in all pool matches;
(d) toss of a coin.

Seeding as it stands

Quarter-final pairings
 Seed 1 (ACC 1) v Seed 8 (ACC 5)
 Seed 2 (ACC 2) v Seed 7 (Heineken Cup 3)
 Seed 3 (ACC 3) v Seed 6 (Heineken Cup 2)
 Seed 4 (ACC 4) v Seed 5 (Heineken Cup 1)

A draw determined the semi-finals pairings.

Knockout stage
All kickoff times are local to the match location.

Quarter-finals

Semi-finals

Final

See also
 2013–14 Heineken Cup

Notes

References

External links

 
2013–14 rugby union tournaments for clubs
2013–14 in European rugby union
2013–14 in English rugby union
2013–14 in French rugby union
2013–14 in Italian rugby union
2013–14 in Romanian rugby union
2013–14 in Welsh rugby union
rugby union
rugby union
2013